Point of No Return is the sixth studio album by R&B singer Keyshia Cole; it was released on October 7, 2014, by Interscope Records and Universal Music Group and served as Cole's final album with the label. The album features production from various music producers including Tim Kelley of Tim & Bob, Mike Will Made It, DJ Mustard, WillieDonut, Amadeus, Stargate and features guest appearances by 2 Chainz, Juicy J, Gavyn Rhone, Wale, August Alsina, Faith Evans and Future.

Background
In August 2013, it was reported that songwriter Elijah Blake started working with Cole on her sixth studio album. During the composition of the album, Cole collaborated with artists Juicy J, Future, Wale, Mike Will Made It, Birdman, and R. Kelly. The album marks Cole's last release with Interscope Records. The album's release was set to coincide with the premiere of her reality show Keyshia Cole: All In on BET. Instead, the show premiered in February 2015.

Singles
On March 15, 2014, Cole took to Instagram to play snippets from her upcoming album. Along the snippets was club banger, "Rick James" (featuring Juicy J). The single premiered on Power 105's morning show, The Breakfast Club, but it was released on digital retailers three months later on June 3, later than "Next Time (Won't Give My Heart Away)" thus becoming the second single, despite having earlier premiere.

On March 20, 2014, Cole's single "Next Time (Won't Give My Heart Away)" was released on her SoundCloud. The single was released on iTunes on March 31, 2014, thus becoming the first digital single of the project. The music videos for both of the songs were released in April.

In July 2014, the third single "She" produced by DJ Mustard was released.

She released a promotional single "I Remember (Part 2)" on September 23, 2014. It is the sequel to her single "I Remember". The music video was released on October 21, 2014.

Other songs 
Despite not being released as singles, Cole appeared on 106 & Park and premiered seven music videos in October 2014: "N.L.U" (featuring 2 Chainz) (October 3, 2014), "Believer" (October 7, 2014), "Love Letter" (featuring Future) (October 8, 2014), "Intro (Last Tango)" (October 9, 2014), "Party Ain't a Party" (featuring Gavin Rhone) (October 10, 2014), "Heat of Passion" (October 13, 2014), She released a further two in January 2015: "Do That For (B.A.B)" (January 6, 2015) and "New Nu" (January 6, 2015).

Commercial performance
The album debuted at number 9 on the US Billboard 200 chart, selling nearly 26,000 copies during its first week.

Track listing

Charts

Weekly charts

Year-end charts

References

2014 albums
Keyshia Cole albums
Tim Kelley
Albums produced by Stargate
Albums produced by Mike Will Made It
Albums produced by DJ Mustard
Concept albums